The following is a list of old-growth forests in the Commonwealth of Massachusetts. Old growth is defined as those forests that have not been logged (and have not been significantly disturbed by human beings) in the last 150 years. "Virgin forests" are those old-growth forests that show no sign of having ever been logged. 

Massachusetts' old growth occurs almost entirely within the Northeastern Highlands ecoregion. The following list identifies some of the sites and their locations:

See also
List of National Natural Landmarks in Massachusetts
List of Massachusetts State Parks

References

For
For
 
For
Forests
Massachusetts
 
Massachusetts